Dorithia wellingana is a species of moth of the family Tortricidae. It is found in Guatemala.

References

Moths described in 1991
Euliini